This Is Us is the seventh studio album (sixth in the US) from American pop group Backstreet Boys. Serving as a follow-up to Unbreakable (2007), it was released on September 30, 2009 in Japan through Sony Music Japan, October 5, 2009 in the UK through RCA, and October 6 in the US.

For the album, the group reunited with previous collaborator and producer Max Martin, with the intention to create their best record since Millennium. They worked with Ryan Tedder, Claude Kelly, Jim Jonsin, RedOne, Ne-Yo, Brian Kennedy, Alex James, Pitbull, Eddie Galan, Rami Yacoub, Kristian Lundin, and T-Pain amongst others for the album as well.

The album debuted at number 9 on the US Billboard 200 making it their seventh top ten album. RedOne produced the album's lead single "Straight Through My Heart" which was released in August 2009. It was their final album on Jive Records and their last of two albums as a quartet before original member Kevin Richardson rejoined the band in 2012.

Recording and production 
In an interview with Extra TV, the group confirmed the title of their seventh album to be This Is Us. In the official press release RCA/Jive Records describes the album as "a finely crafted R&B and pop album from four talented musicians who love what they do and who maintain the rare relevance in an industry that often disposes of pop acts. The 11 songs that make up album are the sounds of four skilled singers with a similar vision, who have dealt with the trials and tribulations that accompany fame at an early age and who came out as one of the most successful groups of all time. It shows remarkable growth as songwriters and continues to give us songs that has made millions smile."

On May 1, 2009, the Backstreet Boys management team expressed discontent at the fact that four recorded songs had been leaked on the internet. In an interview, AJ McLean said that the group were "P.O.ed that music had leaked especially since extra care had been taken to keep the record secret". In the end, however, the group used the feedback from the leaks to help guide the direction of the album and even the song selection by comparing fan reviews to what producers thought about the songs. It was later revealed in 2011, that songs recorded for This Is Us were targeted by the German hacker, Deniz A., also known as DJ Stolen. In July 2010, the Rasch law firm logged a criminal complaint against DJ Stolen for "constantly placing hacked songs on the internet". Amongst those songs listed in the complaint was one called "Masquerade", described at the time as a new recording by the Backstreet Boys.

Regarding their collaboration with RedOne, McLean remarked that it had been largely a last minute affair. Due to timing, the group was not able to make any recordings with the in-demand producer; however, near to the album's turn-in date, RedOne revealed that he had worked on three songs for the group and was more than willing to collaborate. It was also revealed that there had previously been 5 or 6 songs in the running for the lead single, although a Kevin Borg production titled "PDA" was most likely to be released; however, the RedOne production felt like "it was meant to be". One Tedder song, "Shadows", which was co-written by McLean was written for this album, but failed to make it, so Simon Cowell bought the song for Leona Lewis's second album Echo but in the end felt it more suited for a boyband and it was featured on Westlife's 10th album Where We Are.

Promotion and release

Tour

Release 
The group simultaneously released the standard and deluxe editions of the album. The deluxe edition (limited first edition in Japan) featured a DVD with live performances of previous singles at The O2 Arena in London, along with the music video for the first single.

Singles 
 The first single "Straight Through My Heart", was premiered on the group's website on August 17 and released to radio the following day. It peaked at number 3 on the Japan Hot 100 and 18 on the US Hot Dance Club Songs chart. It was certified platinum in Japan.
 The second single "Bigger" was released in the UK on December 14, 2009 and released in the US on February 1, 2010 in AC radios.

Other songs

 "Helpless" serves as the United Kingdom bonus track to the album and features vocals from Cuban-American rapper Pitbull who performs the third verse to the song.

 "International Luv" serves as one of the japanese bonus tracks to the album and is produced by American R&B singer T-Pain who also produces "She's A Dream" on the album.

Critical reception 

This is Us received generally favorable reviews from critics. At Metacritic, which assigns a normalized rating out of 100 to reviews from mainstream critics, the album received an average score of 67, based on 5 reviews.

AllMusic's Stephen Thomas Erlewine found the album's hooks more attention-grabbing than Unbreakable and the production more modern than pandering compared to New Kids on the Block's The Block, concluding that "the group sounds great for their age, and they sound like they're at their peak – which is no guarantee of a hit, but it sure makes for a better album than they've produced in quite a while."
Mikael Wood of Entertainment Weekly praised the album for bringing back the band's old teen-pop sound with new producers and delivering them with confident vocals. Jason Lipshutz of Billboard admired the band's "foray into throbbing electronica" mixed in with the typical pop fare, concluding that it "may be a stepping stone in ushering [Backstreet Boys] away from their days on pop radio and firmly through the club door."

August Brown of the Los Angeles Times gave credit to the band for continuing to deliver catchy tracks but ultimately called the album "a competent but very late-adopted pop-trance slurry." John Terauds of the Toronto Star noted that the tracks have an '80s influence to them but said that "nothing sounds truly original." He also added that it will appeal only to diehard fans of the band. Jonathan Keefe of Slant Magazine criticized the album's producers for crafting songs that range from retreads of other songs ("Straight Through My Heart", "If I Knew Then" and "Undone") to "flat-out embarrassing" ("She's a Dream" and "P.D.A."), concluding that, "No matter how strong their voices might remain and no matter how sincere they may be about keeping their career going, Backstreet Boys' collaborators have failed them here."

Commercial performance
This Is Us debuted and peaked at number nine on the US Billboard 200 the week of October 24, 2009 with 42,000 copies sold, making Backstreet Boys the first group to have its first seven charted albums in the top 10 of the chart since Sade. In its second week, Billboard reported that the sales dropped by 79.8% to 8,000 units and the album moved to number sixty four on the Billboard 200. It was present on the chart for five weeks. As of June 2011, the album has sold 98,000 copies in the United States according to Nielsen SoundScan.

In the United Kingdom, the album debuted at number thirty-nine on the UK Albums Chart, the week of October 17, 2009 and remained on the chart for only a week.

Track listing

Personnel
Credits adapted from album’s liner notes.

Backstreet Boys
 Nick Carter
 Howie Dorough
 Brian Littrell
 AJ McLean

Additional personnel

 Nathaniel Alford – assistant engineer (track 7)
 Printz Board – producer, arranger, and instruments (track 7)
 Al Clay – engineer (track 2)
 Antwoine "T-Wiz" Collins – co-producer and additional programming (track 8)
 Martin Cooke – engineer (track 1)
 Tom Coyne – mastering
 Michael Daley – mixing assistant (track 8)
 Craig Durrance – engineer (track 7)
 Chris Galland – assistant engineer (track 2)
 Serban Ghenea – mixing (tracks 2, 3, 5)
 John Hanes – additional Pro Tools engineering (tracks 2, 3, 5)
 Ghazi Hourani – mixing assistant (track 9)
 Novel Janussi – instruments (track 1)
 Troy "Radio" Johnson – producer, vocal producer, engineer, and instruments (track 11)
 Jim Jonsin – producer, keyboards, and drum programming (track 6)
 Jaycen Joshua – mixing (tracks 7, 10)
 Kenneth Karlin – producer, arranger, and instruments (tracks 3, 5)
 Claude Kelly – additional vocal production and backing vocals (tracks 3, 5)
 Brian Kennedy – producer and instruments (track 8)
 Emanuel Kiriakou – producer, instruments, and programming (track 10)
 Kristian Lundin – additional vocal production (track 8)
 Bill Malina – engineer (tracks 3, 5)
 Mike Mani – producer and additional keyboards (track 6), vocal producer (track 11)
 Fabian Marasciullo – mixing (track 9)
 Rob Marks – engineer and mixing (track 6)
 Max Martin – producer, engineer, and keyboards (track 2)
 AJ Nunez – mixing assistant (track 7)
 Jordan Omley – producer (track 6), vocal producer (track 11)
 Robert Orton – mixing (tracks 1, 4)
 Brent Paschke – engineer (track 10)
 David Pensado – mixing (tracks 7, 11)
 Mr. Pyro – producer (track 9)
 RedOne – producer, engineer, instruments, programming, vocal arrangements, and vocal editing (tracks 1, 4)
 Eric Rennaker – assistant engineer (track 6)
 Tim Roberts – assistant Pro Tools engineer (tracks 2, 3, 5)
 Frank Romano – guitar  (track 6)
 Dave Russel – mixing (track 8)
 Johnny Severin – vocal editing (tracks 1, 4)
 Shellback – engineer, guitar, bass, and drums (track 2)
 Soulshock – producer, arranger, and instruments (tracks 3, 5)
 T-Pain – producer (track 9)
 Sean Tallman – engineer (track 8)
 Ryan Tedder – co-producer (track 11)
 Pat Thrall – editing (track 10)
 Javier Valverde – engineer (track 9)
 Jason Wilkie – assistant engineer (track 6)
 Andrew Wuepper – mixing assistant (track 7)

Charts

Certifications and sales

Release history

References
Notes

External links

2009 albums
Albums produced by Brian Kennedy (record producer)
Albums produced by Emanuel Kiriakou
Albums produced by Jim Jonsin
Albums produced by Max Martin
Albums produced by RedOne
Albums produced by Ryan Tedder
Albums produced by Soulshock and Karlin
Albums produced by T-Pain
Albums recorded at Westlake Recording Studios
Backstreet Boys albums
Jive Records albums
RCA Records albums